Cambria was the name of a number of steamships.

 , in service with the London and North Western Railway until 1861.
 , an Anchor Line ship wrecked off the north west coast of Ireland in 1870 with the loss of 179 lives.
 , in service with the London and North Western Railway from 1889 to 1894
 , in service with the London and North Western Railway from 1897 to 1920
 , in service with the London and North Western Railway from 1921 to 1923, and the London, Midland and Scottish Railway from 1923 to 1948

Ship names